Maroulas is a local community of the Rethymno Municipality in the  Rethymno (regional unit) of the region of Crete established by Kallikratis reform. It is traditional settlement and is classified in Class II, that is of average cultural value (Government Gazette 728/21-9-1995).

Geography, origin of name, history
Maroulas lies southeast of Rethymno and 10 kilometers from this city at an altitude of 240 meters. Most buildings date back to the Venetian period, but the area is likely to be inhabited since the Minoan period. According to tradition, the village took its name from the shepherdess Maroula, who, while grazing her sheep in the region, found a spring of cool digestive water.
Population of  Maroulas

Archaeological discoveries , buildings, temples 

Two cemeteries of the palatial period of Minoan period have been revealed in the area. The findings of the cemeteries are exhibited at the Archaeological Museum of Rethymno.

The Venetians built two towers, which are still preserved, and other buildings with battlements. There are several coats of arms on the doors of buildings. In 1630 Turks settled in Maroulas. Visitors can see a mill, large arched doors of the Venetian mansions, narrow streets, and arches.

The 'Temple of Prophet Elias', built at the top of the hill, has extensive views to the Cretan Sea.

Miscellaneous 
There is a public bus service (KTEL) from/to Rethymno (two services, morning and noon on weekdays and no services on weekends) 

Since 21 July 2005 the area of Maroulas is included in the Cadastre system and is under the authority of the Cadastral Office of Rethymno (20 Hortatzis Str., ZIP: 74100, Rethymno, Phone n.: 0030-28310-22403)

See also
List of settlements in the Rethymno regional unit

External links 
Photo Gallery, Web site of municipality of Rethymnno retrieved at 10 April 2012
Cycling routes, Web site of Tourism Promotion Committee of Rethymno Prefecture, retrieved at 10 April 2012

References

Populated places in Rethymno (regional unit)